Nová Ves u Chotěboře is a municipality and village in Havlíčkův Brod District in the Vysočina Region of the Czech Republic. It has about 500 inhabitants.

Administrative parts
The village of Nový Dvůr is an administrative part of Nová Ves u Chotěboře.

History
Nová Ves u Chotěboře was founded in 1288 by knight Mstislav. It was originally called Fojtova Ves and later it was renamed.

References

Villages in Havlíčkův Brod District